Calamine is an unincorporated community in Sharp County, Arkansas, United States.

History
Zinc mining gave the town its start, hence the name calamine.

References

Unincorporated communities in Sharp County, Arkansas
Unincorporated communities in Arkansas